Levantine may refer to:

 Anything pertaining to the Levant, the region centered around modern Syria, Lebanon, Israel, Palestine, and Jordan, including any person from the Levant
 Syria (region), corresponding to the modern countries of the Levant
 Levantine Sea, the easternmost part of the Mediterranean
 Levantines (also Latin-Levantines, Franco-Levantines, Italian Levantines), Members of the Latin Church in the Middle East: 
 Levantine Arabic, a variety of Arabic
 Levantine cuisine, the cuisine of the Levant
 Levantine Cultural Center, subsequently The Markaz, a cultural center in Los Angeles, California
 Batavia (cloth), also called "Levantine", a type of cloth originally produced in the Levant.

Language and nationality disambiguation pages